This is a list of lighthouses in Hawaii. Fifteen lighthouses in Hawaii are associated with the U.S. Coast Guard. Including minor lights, there are 43 lights in total.

Lighthouses

Minor Lights

There are over 30 "minor lights" in Hawaii, most if not all of them are on beacons or poles. The "Year built" column only represents the most recent structure, all of the lights listed below are active unless noted otherwise. Complete data for any given light may be unavailable due to poor record keeping, or lack details from reliable sources.

See also

 List of lighthouses in the United States
 Lists of lighthouses and lightvessels

References

External links
LighthouseFriends.Com's list of Hawaii lighthouses

Hawaii
Lighthouses

Lighthouses